The United States Senate election of 1958 in Connecticut was held on November 4, 1958. Democratic Thomas J. Dodd defeated incumbent senator William A. Purtell who ran for a second term.

This was one of ten seats Democrats gained from the Republican Party in 1958, part of a record swing (including the elections of new Senators from Alaska and Hawaii).

General election

Candidates
Thomas J. Dodd, U.S. Representative from Old Lyme (Democratic)
Vivien Kellems, industrialist, inventor, and tax protester (Independent)
William A. Purtell, incumbent Senator since 1953 (Republican

Results

See also 
 1958 United States Senate elections

References

Connecticut
1958
1958 Connecticut elections